Kenji Yamada may refer to:

, Japanese basketball player
, Japanese footballer
Kenji Yamada (judoka) (1924–2014), American judoka
Kenji Yamada (politician), Japanese Liberal Democratic representative for Hyōgo 7th district